The Mobile Revelers were a National Basketball Development League (NBDL) team based in Mobile, Alabama. Playing their home games at the Mobile Civic Center, the Revelers was a charter franchise in the 2001-02 season and folded after the 2002-03 season. The team was named after the people who took part in Mardi Gras parades as the Mardi Gras tradition started in Mobile.

The National Basketball Association (NBA) announced the Revelers as one of the NBDL charter franchises in July 2001. In 2003 the Revelers won the League championship, defeating the Fayetteville Patriots, two games to one. However the league contracted the franchise in June 2003.

Season-by-season

NBA affiliates
None

References

 
Basketball teams established in 2001
Basketball teams disestablished in 2003
Basketball teams in Alabama